Ranks and insignia of the Russian Federation's armed forces from 1994 to 2010 were affected by the disintegration of the former Soviet armed forces, and there were other changes in insignia design when the newly established Russian Federation came into existence. The ranks depicted below were replaced with those adopted by decree № 293 of the President of the Russian Federation on 11 March 2010. The transition began with the issue of new military uniforms to the armed services in 2008 in the Moscow area and in 2010 nationwide. The ranks of marshal of the branch and chief marshal were officially abolished as a result of the 1994 regulations.

Shoulder boards

Enlisted men 
Enlisted men wear no rank on their working uniform shoulder boards. On parade uniforms, the shoulder board shows a Cyrillic letter symbol.

 ВС — armed forces personnel
 Ф — fleet personnel (Russian: Флот; flot)
 К — army and air force military student (Russian: Курсант; kursant)
 Anchor — naval military student 
 Н — students of the Nakhimov Naval School (Russian: Нахимовское военно-морское училище; Nakhimovskoye voyenno-morskoye uchilishche)
 СВУ — students of the Suvorov Military School (Russian: Суворовское военное училище; Suvorovskoye voyennoye uchilishche)
 ВМУ — students of the school of military music (Russian: Военно-музыкальное училище; voyenno-muzykalnoye uchilishche)
 КК — cadets of the cadet corps (Russian: Кадетский корпус; kadetsky korpus)
 МКК — Kronstadt Sea Cadet Corps (Russian: Кронштадтский морской кадетский корпус; Kronshtadtsky morskoy kadetsky korpus)
 ВВ — internal troops (Russian: Внутренние войска; vnutrenniye voyska)

 Non-commissioned officers 
Non-commissioned officers up to staff sergeant (Russian: cтаршина; starshina) wear shoulder boards with the Cyrillic letter symbol for their branch and their rank stripes.
 Field uniform — camouflage colour
 Service uniform — yellow coloured
 Parade uniform — gold coloured

 Warrant officers and michman 
Warrant officers and michman'' wore shoulder boards similar to enlisted personnel and non-commissioned officers, but their ranks were shown by small stars arranged in vertical order.

Distinction insignia

Enlisted personnel, NCOs and warrant officers

Army, air force and naval officers 

 Shoulder boards up to company level
 One vertical stripe, padding with basic ornament (in longitudinal direction appliqued cords in piston-embroidery), metal stars (small 13 mm diameter); shoulder boards to field uniforms simple without basic ornament.
 Shoulder boards to field officers/ staff officers
 Basic ornament identical to company level, two vertical stripes, metal stars (big 20 mm diameter).
 Top level appointments
 Basic ornament longitudinal- and vertical embroidery, embroidered stars (diameter 22 mm).
 Marshal of the Russian Federation
 Basic ornaments longitudinal-and vertical embroidery, one embroidered big star (diameter 40 mm), Coat of arms of Russia.

Officer insignia – army, air force, SMT, airborne and space forces

Officer insignia – navy

See also 
 History of Russian military ranks
 Ranks and insignia of the Imperial Russian Armed Forces
 Military ranks of the Soviet Union (1918–1935)
 Military ranks of the Soviet Union (1935–1940)
 Military ranks of the Soviet Union (1940–1943)
 Military ranks of the Soviet Union (1943–1955)
 Military ranks of the Soviet Union (1955–1991)
 Army ranks and insignia of the Russian Federation
 Naval ranks and insignia of the Russian Federation

References 

 
Russian Federation Army